Robinson's Warehouse is a warehouse on Bathurst Parade, on the Floating Harbour in Bristol, England.

It was built in 1874 by William Bruce Gingell, and is an example of the Bristol Byzantine style with yellow and red brick and Moorish arches.

It was formerly the warehouse of Robinson's Oil Seed Manufactory, and has also been known as Warriner's Warehouse.

It has been designated by English Heritage as a grade II listed building.

References

See also
 
 Grade II listed buildings in Bristol

Bristol Harbourside
Warehouses in England
Industrial buildings completed in 1874
Grade II listed buildings in Bristol
Grade II listed industrial buildings
Brick buildings and structures
Byzantine Revival architecture in the United Kingdom
1874 establishments in England